Cefn Coch is a small village or hamlet near Llanfair Caereinion in Mid Wales, located at . In 2012, the village was chosen as the site for a substation serving several wind farms in the area, causing public outcry.

References

Villages in Powys